Alessandro Talotti (7 October 1980 – 16 May 2021) was an Italian high jumper.

Biography
Talotti finished fourth at the 2002 European Championships in Athletics and twelfth at the 2004 Olympic Games. He also competed at the 2003 World Championships, the 2005 European Indoor Championships, and the 2008 Olympic Games without reaching the final. Talotti was the Italian high jump champion in 2000 and 2004, out jumping Giulio Ciotti, Nicola Ciotti, and Andrea Bettinelli in those campaigns.

His personal best jump was 2.30 metres, achieved in June 2003 in Florence, and which he thrice equalled thereafter. In January 2005 Talotti jumped 2.32 metres on the indoor track in Glasgow.

Talotti died of stomach cancer on 16 May 2021, at the age of 40.

Achievements

See also
 Italian all-time top lists - High jump

References

External links
 

1980 births
2021 deaths
Sportspeople from Udine
Italian male high jumpers
Athletes (track and field) at the 2004 Summer Olympics
Athletes (track and field) at the 2008 Summer Olympics
Olympic athletes of Italy
World Athletics Championships athletes for Italy
Deaths from stomach cancer
Deaths from cancer in Friuli Venezia Giulia